Noblerot is Ali Project's fourth studio album, released on November 21, 1998.

Track listing

References

1998 albums
Ali Project albums